Ursensollen is a municipality in the district of Amberg-Sulzbach in Bavaria in Germany.

Geography

Ursensollen is in the region Upper Palatinate-North about 10 km to the west of Amberg.

The following districts belong to this town: Allmannsfeld, Bittenbrunn, Egelhofen, Eigentshofen, Ehringsfeld, Erlheim, Garsdorf, Götzendorf, Gunzelsdorf, Guttenberg, Haag, Hausen, Häuslöd, Heimhof, Heinzhof, Hohenkemnath, Inselsberg, Kemnatheröd, Kotzheim, Littenschwang, Oberhof, Oberleinsiedl, Ödallerzhof, Reinbrunn, Reusch, Richt, Richtheim, Rückertshof, Salleröd, Sauheim, Stockau, Thonhausen, Ullersberg, Unterleinsiedl, Ursensollen, Wappersdorf, Weiherzant, Winkl, Wollenzhofen, Zant.

Population

The districts of the town had a population of 2,678 in 1970, 3,518 in 2000, and 3,745 in 2009.

References

Amberg-Sulzbach